The Bite is an American television series created by Robert King and Michelle King. A satirical drama about coronavirus, it premiered on May 21, 2021, on Spectrum Originals.

Premise 
A fictional, host mutational and socially homicidal strain of the SARS CoV-2 virus arrives with the second wave of the COVID-19 pandemic in New York.

Cast 

 Audra McDonald as Rachel Boutella
 Taylor Schilling as Lily Leithauser
 Steven Pasquale as Dr. Zach
 Phillipa Soo as Cydni Estereo 
 Will Swenson as Brian Ritter
 Leslie Uggams as Hester Boutella

Episodes

References

External links 

 

2020s American drama television series
2021 American television series debuts
English-language television shows
Television shows about the COVID-19 pandemic
Spectrum Originals original programming